The Juno Award for Group of the Year has been awarded annually since 1970 in recognition of the best musical group or band in Canada. It is presented by the Canadian Academy of Recording Arts and Sciences (CARAS). The five nominees in the category are decided through a combination of sales and CARAS member voting, and the recipient is chosen from among these nominees by member voting.

The award was previously named as Top Vocal Instrumental Group (1970–1971), Vocal Instrumental Group of the Year (1972–1973), and Best Group (1999–2002). In 1972 and 1973, awards were also given for Outstanding Performance of the Year – Group.

Achievements

With six wins, the alternative rock band Arkells is the most winningest group in the category. Arkells is also tied for most consecutive wins, three, with rock band Loverboy and country rock band Blue Rodeo.  Blue Rodeo's 13 total nominations is slightly edged out by the 14 garnered by hard rock and progressive rock band Rush, including a record eight consecutive nominations from 1977 to 1984. The record for the most nominations without ever winning is held by April Wine, who were nominated 8 times from 1975 to 1983.

Country and folk group The Rankin Family, winners in 1994, are the only non-rock group to ever win the award. Though several French-language groups have been nominated, none has ever won the award.

Recipients

Top Vocal Instrumental Group (1970–1971)

Vocal Instrumental Group of the Year and Outstanding Performance of the Year – Group (1972–1973)

In 1972 and 1973, two awards were given for group of the year and outstanding performance by a group.

Group of the Year (1974–1998)

Best Group (1999–2002)

Group of the Year (2003–present)

See also

 List of bands from Canada
 Music of Canada

References

External links
 Official website of the Juno Awards
 Official website of the Canadian Academy of Recording Arts and Sciences

Group